Montpellier Handball, formerly named Montpellier Agglomération Handball, is a handball club from Montpellier, France. Montpellier is the only French club to ever have won the EHF Champions League.

Crest, colours, supporters

Naming history

Kits

Accomplishments
LNH Division 1: (14)
 Champions: 1994–95, 1997–98, 1998–99, 1999–00, 2001–02, 2002–03, 2003–04, 2004–05, 2005–06, 2007–08, 2008–09, 2009–10, 2010–11, 2011–12
EHF Champions League: (2)
 Champions: 2002–03, 2017–18
Coupe de France: (13)
 Champions: 1998–99, 1999–2000, 2000–01, 2001–02, 2002–03, 2004–05, 2005–06, 2007–08, 2008–09, 2009–10, 2011–12, 2012–13, 2015–16
Coupe de la Ligue: (10)
 Champions: 2003–04, 2004–05, 2005–06, 2006–07, 2007–08, 2009–10, 2010–11, 2011–12, 2013–14, 2015–16
Trophée des Champions: (3)
 Champions: 2010, 2011, 2018
Championnat de France N1B
 First place: 1991–92
Championnat de France Nationale 2
 First place: 1988–89, 1999–00 (rés.)
Championnat de France Nationale 3
 First place: 1987–88
 Double
 Winners (10): 1998–99, 1999–00, 2001–02, 2002–03, 2004–04, 2005–06, 2007–08, 2008–09, 2009–10, 2011–12 
 Triple Crown
 Winners (1): 2002–03

European record

Team

Current squad
Squad for the 2022–23 season

Goalkeepers
 12  Charles Bolzinger
 16  Kévin Bonnefoi
 92  Rémi Desbonnet
Left Wingers
9  Hugo Descat 
 10  Lucas Pellas
 17  Jaime Fernández
Right Wingers
 32  Yanis Lenne
Line players
 19  Arthur Lenne
 93  Veron Načinović

Left Backs
 22  Karl Konan
 25  Andreas Holst Jensen
Central Backs
4  Diego Simonet
5  Kyllian Villeminot
 20  Staš Skube
Right Backs
 11  Giorgi Tskhovrebadze
 13  Julien Bos
 18  Marko Panić
 28  Valentin Porte (c)

Transfers
Transfers for the 2023–24 season

 Joining
  Ahmed Hesham (CB) (from  USAM Nîmes Gard)
  Sebastian Karlsson (RW) (from  IK Sävehof)

 Leaving
  Kévin Bonnefoi (GK) (to  HC Kriens-Luzern)
  Hugo Descat (LW) (to  Telekom Veszprém)
  Julien Bos (RB) (to  HBC Nantes)

Former club members

Notable former players

  Joël Abati (2007–2009)
  William Accambray (2005–2014)
  Benjamin Afgour (2017–2020)
  Igor Anić (2003–2007)
  Grégory Anquetil (1989–2007)
  Arnaud Bingo (2016–2019)
  Sébastien Bosquet (2003–2005)
  Cédric Burdet (1995–2003, 2006–2009)
  Laurent Busselier (1996–2000)
  Patrick Cazal (1994–1999)
  Hugo Descat (2019–2023)
  Didier Dinart (1996–2003)
  Adrien Dipanda (2006–2011)
  Frédéric Dole (2004–2007)
  Ludovic Fabregas (2011–2018)
  Jérôme Fernandez (1999–2002)
  Vincent Gérard (2006–2008, 2015–2019)
  Andrej Golić (1992–2006)
  Mathieu Grébille (2008–2020)
  Michaël Guigou (1999–2019)
  Samuel Honrubia (2001–2012)
  François-Xavier Houlet (1994–1996)
  Franck Junillon (1987–2008)
  Luka Karabatic (2007–2012)
  Nikola Karabatić (2000–2005, 2009–2013)
  Daouda Karaboué (1993–2000, 2004–2010)
  Geoffroy Krantz (2000–2007)
  Yanis Lenne (2019–)
  Pascal Mahé (1992–1996)
  Bruno Martini (2000–2003)
  Olivier Maurelli (1995–1996)
  Philippe Médard (1987–1989)
  Thierry Omeyer (2000–2006, 2013–2014)
  Valentin Porte (2016–)
  Laurent Puigségur (1990–2006)
  Melvyn Richardson (2017–2021)
  Mickaël Robin (2010–2014)
  Arnaud Siffert (2013–2016)
  Stéphane Stoecklin (1988–1990)
  Marc Wiltberger (1993–1996)
  Semir Zuzo (2003–2006)
  Abdelkrim Bendjemil (1990–1992)
  Rabah Gherbi (1996–1999, 2001–2003)
  Lucas Moscariello (2021–)
  Diego Simonet (2013–)
  Marko Panić (2021–)
  Felipe Borges (2013–2016)
  David Juříček (2004–2011)
  Jan Sobol (2007–2010)
  Venio Losert (2014–2015)
  Petar Metličić (2012–2013)
  Veron Načinović (2021–)
  Marin Šego (2019–2022)
  Damien Kabengele (1996–2006)
  Mohamed Mamdouh (2017–2019)
  Cristian Malmagro (2012–2013)
  Balázs Laluska (2014–2015)
  Uroš Vilovski (2012–2013)
  Allahkaram Esteki (2015–2016)
  Ólafur Guðmundsson (2021–2022)
  Geir Sveinsson (1995–1997)
  Jonas Truchanovičius (2016–2021)
  Erlend Mamelund (2012–2013)
  Alexis Borges (2020–2021)
  Gilberto Duarte (2019–2022)
  Ion Mocanu (1994–1995)
  Sorin Toacsen (1996–2000, 2003–2004)
  Igor Chumak (1992–1996)
  Jure Dolenec (2013–2017)
  Matej Gaber (2013–2016)
  Dragan Gajić (2011–2016)
  Vid Kavtičnik (2009–2019)
  Borut Mačkovšek (2014–2015)
  Primož Prošt (2011–2012)
  Miha Žvižej (2016–2017)
  Mladen Bojinović (2002–2012)
  Mitar Markez (2010–2011)
  Rastko Stefanovič (2002–2004)
  Nebojša Stojinović (2008–2010)
  Nikola Portner (2016–2020)
  Richard Štochl (2010–2012)
  Martin Frändesjö (2000–2001)
  Lucas Pellas (2020–)
  Fredric Pettersson (2018–2021)
  Karl Wallinius (2021–2022)
  Aymen Hammed (2009–2011)
  Wissem Hmam (2005–2014)
  Marouen Maggaiz (2006–2008)
  Heykel Megannem (2007–2009)
  Sobhi Sioud (2001–2007)
  Mohamed Soussi (2017–2020)
  Issam Tej (2006–2015)
  Aymen Toumi (2015–2018)

Former coaches

References

External links
  
 

French handball clubs
Sport in Montpellier